Inés Ferrer Suárez and Richèl Hogenkamp were the defending champions, having won the event in 2012, but both players chose not to defend their title.

Renata Voráčová and Barbora Záhlavová-Strýcová won the tournament, defeating Martina Borecká and Tereza Malíková in the all-Czech final, 6–3, 6–4.

Seeds

Draw

References 
 Draw

ITS Cup - Doubles
ITS Cup